The 1972 All-Ireland Senior Football Championship Final was the 85th All-Ireland Final and the deciding match of the 1972 All-Ireland Senior Football Championship, an inter-county Gaelic football tournament for the top teams in Ireland.

Match 1

Summary
Mick O'Dwyer brought the sides level to force a replay.

Details

Match 2

Summary
Paddy Devlin from Tyrone, who later took charge of the 1974 final, oversaw the replay.

Offaly won the replay.

Tony McTague scored sixteen points in the two games.

Paddy Fenning scored Offaly's goal.

This was Kerry's biggest ever defeat in an All-Ireland Final.

It was also the last time Micks O'Connell and O'Dwyer played at Croke Park.

Details

References

All-Ireland Senior Football Championship Final
All-Ireland Senior Football Championship Final, 1972
All-Ireland Senior Football Championship Finals
All-Ireland Senior Football Championship Finals
Kerry county football team matches
Offaly county football team matches